Sung-Hoon Kim (born 1978) is a South Korean pianist.

References
  Sviatoslav Richter International Piano Competition
  Hong Kong International Piano Competition

South Korean classical pianists
Living people
1978 births
21st-century classical pianists